Mahonstown may refer to the following places in Ireland:

 Mahonstown, Meath, a townland; see List of townlands of County Meath
 Mahonstown, Westmeath, a townland